A sound server is software that manages the use of and access to audio devices (usually a sound card). It commonly runs as a background process.

Sound server in an operating system

In a Unix-like operating system, a sound server mixes different data streams and sends out a single unified audio to an output device. The mixing is usually done by software, or by hardware if there is a supported sound card.

Layers

The "sound stack" can be visualized as follows, with programs in the upper layers calling elements in the lower layers:

 Applications (e.g. mp3 player, web video)
 Sound server (e.g. aRts, ESD, JACK, PulseAudio)
 Sound subsystem (described as kernel modules or drivers; e.g. OSS, ALSA)
 Operating system kernel (e.g. Linux, Unix)

Motivation 

Sound servers appeared in Unix-like operating systems after limitations in Open Sound System were recognized. OSS is a basic sound interface that was incapable of playing multiple streams simultaneously, dealing with multiple sound cards, or streaming sound over the network. 

A sound server can provide these features by running as a daemon. It receives calls from different programs and sound flows, mixes the streams, and sends raw audio out to the audio device.

With a sound server, users can also configure global and per-application sound preferences.

Diversification and problems 

 there are multiple sound servers; some focus on providing very low latency, while others concentrate on features suitable for general desktop systems. While diversification allows a user to choose just the features that are important to a particular application, it also forces developers to accommodate these options by necessitating code that is compatible with the various sound servers available. Consequently, this variety has resulted in a desire for a standard API to unify efforts.

List of sound servers
 aRts
 Enlightened Sound Daemon
 JACK
 Network Audio System
 PipeWire
 PulseAudio
 sndio - OpenBSD audio and MIDI framework

Streaming 
 Icecast
 SHOUTcast

References

External links

 Introduction to Linux Audio
 RFC: GNOME 2.0 Multimedia strategy

Servers (computing)